Samuel Cornette Collins (September 28, 1898 in Kentucky – June 19, 1984 in Washington, DC.) was an American chemist, physicist, and engineer. 

He obrained his PhD in chemistry from the University of North Carolina in 1927. He taught at Carson-Newman College, the University of Tennessee, Tennessee State Teachers College, and the University of North Carolina, and joined the Massachusetts Institute of Technology as a research associate in the chemistry department in 1930.  After World War II, he returned to MIT, joining the Department of Mechanical Engineering. He was appointed professor in 1949 and retired in 1964. He was named Professor Emeritus, serving in this post until 1983.

Collins developed the first mass-produced helium liquefier, Collins Helium Cryostat, acquiring the title "Father of Practical Helium Liquefiers." Collin's refrigerators, powered by a two-piston expansion engine, provided the first reliable supplies of liquid helium in quantities of several hundred to several thousand liters. 

Among other uses, these refrigerators were used to liquefy and transport helium and deuterium for the first hydrogen bomb explosion, Ivy Mike in 1952.

He was awarded the John Price Wetherill Medal in 1951 and the Rumford Prize in 1965.

References

External links
 
 
 
 
 

1898 births
1984 deaths
20th-century American physicists
ASME Medal recipients
20th-century American engineers